Viiala is a former municipality of Finland. On 1 January 2007, it was consolidated with Toijala to form the town of Akaa.

Viiala is located in the province of Western Finland and is part of the Pirkanmaa region. The municipality had a population of 5,329 (2003) and covered an area of 56.78 km2 of which 5.88 km2 is water. The population density was 104.7 inhabitants per km2.

The municipality was unilingually Finnish.

Notable people
Tenho Saurén – Finnish comic actor
Aimo Lahti – Finnish weapons designer
Hessu Maxx – Finnish drummer
Toni Lähteenmäki – Finnish race car driver

See also
 Kylmäkoski

External links
 
 Town of Akaa – Official website

Populated places disestablished in 2007
Former municipalities of Finland
Akaa